Wildflowers of the Canadian Rocky Mountains is an image list of flowering plants found in the Rocky Mountains in Canada.

Resources

Alberta Wayside Wildflowers - Linda Kershaw (Lone Pine) 
Handbook of the Canadian Rockies - Ben Gadd (Corax)

References 

.
.
Flora of Alberta
Flora of British Columbia
Lists of biota of Canada